is a railway station in the city of  Shinshiro, Aichi Prefecture, Japan, operated by Central Japan Railway Company (JR Tōkai).

Lines
Ōmi  Station is served by the Iida Line, and is located 27.9 kilometers from the starting point of the line at Toyohashi Station.

Station layout
The station has a one side platform and one island platform, of which the outer track (Platform 3) is unused. The platforms are connected by a level crossing.The station building has automated ticket machines, TOICA automated turnstiles and is unattended.

Platforms

Adjacent stations

|-
!colspan=5|Central Japan Railway Company

Station history
Ōmi Station was established on September 23, 1900, as a station on the now-defunct . The station was renamed  on March 15, 1903. On February 1, 1923, the Hōraiji Railway connected to this station. On August 1, 1943, the Hōraiji Railway and the Toyokawa Railway were nationalized along with some other local lines to form the Japanese Government Railways (JGR) Iida Line, and the station was renamed to its present name. The present station building was completed in August 1969. Scheduled freight operations were discontinued in 1984. The station has been unattended since April 1985. Along with its division and privatization of JNR on April 1, 1987, the station came under the control and operation of the Central Japan Railway Company.

Surrounding area
 Japan National Route 151
 Nagashino Castle ruins

See also
 List of Railway Stations in Japan

References

External links

Railway stations in Japan opened in 1900
Railway stations in Aichi Prefecture
Iida Line
Stations of Central Japan Railway Company
Shinshiro, Aichi